Heya or Hey Ya may refer to:

Heya (sumo) from the Japanese word for "room" (部屋), also in compounds -beya, or Sumo-beya, an organization of sumo wrestlers (pronounced beya when in compound form)
 Heya TV, from the Arabic word for "Hers", an Arabic-language Lebanese television channel, carried on UBI World TV
 Heya wa Howa, alternative title of Howa wa heya ("Him and Her"), Egyptian TV show
 He Ya (Chinese: 河丫), a minor character related to Shang Yang in the Chinese television series The Qin Empire
Hey'a, a variant name for Islamic religious police

Music 
 Heya (J.J. Light song), 1967 single by Navajo musician Jim Stallings, covered by Krokus on the album Round 13
 Heya (J.J. Light album), 1967 album by Jim Stallings
 "Heya", a 1987 single by George Kranz
 "Heya-hee", a rainsong by Sacred Spirit

See also
Heyah, a Polish mobile phone service
 Hey Ya!, a song by OutKast